"Stroke You Up" is a song by American R&B duo Changing Faces that was recorded for their eponymous debut album (1994). The song was released as the album's debut single on July 14, 1994. It was certified platinum by the RIAA and sold 700,000 copies domestically. It features uncredited vocals from R. Kelly.  A remix version also written and produced by Kelly, which originally appeared on the soundtrack to the 1994 Keenen Ivory Wayans film A Low Down Dirty Shame.

Track listings
12", 33 RPM, Vinyl
"Stroke You Up" (LP Mix) – 4:32
"Stroke You Up" (Original Instrumental) – 4:32
"Stroke You Up" (Extended Remix) – 6:10
"Stroke You Up" (Remix Instrumental) – 6:10

Personnel
Information taken from Discogs.
assistant engineering – Martin Stebbing
engineering – Peter Mokran, Joshua Shapera
guitar – Keith Henderson
mixing – Peter Mokran, R. Kelly
piano – Lafayette Carthon
production – R. Kelly
vocals – Changing Faces
writing – R. Kelly

Chart performance

Weekly charts

Year-end charts

Notes

1994 singles
Changing Faces (group) songs
Song recordings produced by R. Kelly
Songs written by R. Kelly
1994 songs
Big Beat Records (American record label) singles
Contemporary R&B ballads